Datu Abul Khayr Dangcal Alonto (October 30, 1945 – May 9, 2019) was a Filipino businessman and politician. He was appointed by President Rodrigo Duterte in September 2016 as the chairperson of the Mindanao Development Authority, serving as its first Muslim chair until his death in May 2019.

Early life and education 
Alonto was born on October 30, 1945 in Dansalan (now Marawi CIty), in the then-undivided Lanao province. He was the second son of former Philippine Ambassador to Libya and Lanao del Sur's first governor Abdul Ghaffur Madki Alangadi Alonto, and Bai Hajja Rasmia Indol Dangcal. He has four other brothers and a sister.

He studied Political Science at Cairo University in Egypt and later became a student of San Beda College of Law. While a law student, Alonto organized the LAM ALIF, a Muslim youth group, in response to the Jabidah Massacre on March 18, 1968. Because of the Bangsamoro struggle, Alonto did not become a lawyer. Members of LAM ALIF would become core leaders of the Moro National Liberation Front (MNLF).

Political career 
Alonto was elected as vice mayor of Marawi City in 1972 and was the youngest city executive of the country during that year. In 1974, he became acting mayor of Marawi but before being sworn in as the city's chief executive, he joined his MNLF comrades and went "underground" to fight against the abuses committed during the Martial Law regime. He was vice chair to Nur Misuari in the then-undivided MNLF. He was also the chair of the MNLF Northern Mindanao Regional Revolutionary Committee.

In 1979, more than two years after the 1976 Tripoli Agreement was signed, Alonto participated in the institutionalization of the Autonomous Region in Muslim Mindanao. He was elected as Assemblyman and sat as the Interim Head of the Regional Autonomous Government and subsequently elected Speaker of the Regional Legislative Assembly, in absentia after he resigned as the Interim Head of the Regional Autonomous Government.

In 1982, Alonto organized and established the Muslim Federal Party which became the rallying flag of the Muslim participation in the Protest Movement. He also became Nacionalista Party Vice President for Mindanao.

Alonto was the Deputy Secretary General of the National Unification Council during the 1986 Snap Presidential Election and underwent serious studies on federalism in Malaysia, United States of America, Germany, and Switzerland. He was appointed Ambassador Extraordinary and Plenipotentiary and Chief of Mission to Nigeria and 21 African States in 1994.

In February 2014, the original members of the MNLF Central Committee installed Alonto as Chairman of the MNLF. He was a staunch supporter of the Bangsamoro Basic Law, a bill which sought for the establishment of a proposed new autonomous political entity known as the Bangsamoro Autonomous Region, to replace the current ARMM.

MinDA Chair 
Alonto was appointed by President Duterte on September 9, 2016 as the third chairperson of the Mindanao Development Authority (MinDA), a cabinet-level position and having the rank of Department Secretary. He was the first Muslim chair of the agency since its creation in 2010 and was one of the five Muslim members of Duterte's cabinet, the other four being National Commission on Muslim Filipinos (NCMF) chairman Saidamen Balt Pangarungan, former NCMF chairwoman Yasmin Busran-Lao, former Technical Education and Skills Development Authority Director-General Guiling Mamondiong, and Presidential Adviser on Overseas Filipino Workers Abdullah Mama-o. As MinDA chair, Alonto also held various positions such as being the Philippine Senior Official for BIMP-EAGA and being an ex officio member of the NEDA and TIEZA Boards.

Business career 
Alonto also participated in business ventures and became Chairman of the Janoub Philippines Development Corporation, one of the pioneers in bringing in foreign investments to the Autonomous Region in Muslim Mindanao (ARMM) particularly the development of the region's palm oil industry. He was also a member of the board of National Steel Corporation.

Personal life and death 
Alonto was married to Bai Norhata Macatbar with whom he had six children– Amera, Ayesha Merdeka, Ameena Rocaya, Abdul Gaffur II, Abul Khayr Amalon II, and Akhzanuniza.

Alonto died at around 10 p.m. PHT on May 9, 2019 due to lung and heart complications. He underwent angioplasty operation, but his body succumbed to complications due to pneumonia. His death was declared at the National Kidney and Transplant Institute in Quezon City. He was 73 years old.

References

External links 
 Mindanao Development Authority Official Website (archived)

1945 births
2019 deaths
20th-century Filipino businesspeople
21st-century Filipino businesspeople
Cairo University alumni
Duterte administration personnel
Deaths from pneumonia in the Philippines
Heads of government agencies of the Philippines
Mayors of places in Lanao del Sur
Filipino diplomats
Governors of the Autonomous Region in Muslim Mindanao
People from Marawi
Filipino Muslims
San Beda University alumni